Pararosaniline, Basic Red 9, or C.I. 42500 is an organic compound with the formula [(H2NC6H4)3C]Cl. It is a magenta solid with a variety of uses as a dye. It is one of the four components of basic fuchsine. (The others are rosaniline, new fuchsine and magenta II.) It is structurally related to other triarylmethane dyes called methyl violets including crystal violet, which feature methyl groups on nitrogen.

It is prepared by the condensation of aniline and para-aminobenzaldehyde. Alternatively, it arises from the oxidation of 4,4'-bis(aminophenyl)methane in the presence of aniline.

Uses
It is used to dye polyacrylonitrile fibers.
It is used to detect sulfur dioxide.
Pararosaniline is used as a colorimetric test for aldehydes, in the Schiff test. It is the only basic fuchsine component suitable for making the aldehyde-fuchsine stain for pancreatic islet beta cells.
It has use as an Antischistosomal.

Related compounds
 4,4'-Thiodianiline
 4,4'-Methylenedianiline
 4,4'-Oxydianiline
 Dapsone

References

Further reading
.
.

Triarylmethane dyes
IARC Group 2B carcinogens
Anilines
Chlorides